The Division of Wentworth is an Australian electoral division in the state of New South Wales.

History

The division was proclaimed in 1900 and was one of the original 65 divisions contested at the first federal election. The division is named after William Charles Wentworth (1790–1872), an Australian explorer and statesman.  In 1813 he accompanied Blaxland and Lawson on their crossing of the Blue Mountains.

Historically considered a safe seat for the Liberal Party of Australia, Wentworth is one of only two original federation divisions in New South Wales, along with the Division of North Sydney, which have never been held by the Australian Labor Party, though Labor candidate Jessie Street came within 1.6 percent of winning Wentworth at the 1943 election landslide. The electorate is the nation's wealthiest, contains the nation's largest Jewish population and contains the nation's fifth-largest number of same-sex couples.

Its most prominent member was Malcolm Turnbull, who served as Prime Minister of Australia from September 2015 until August 2018. Other prominent members have included Sir Eric Harrison, who was the first Deputy of the Liberal Party; Les Bury and Bob Ellicott, who both served as prolific ministers in successive Liberal governments of the 1960s and 1970s; Peter Coleman, who had served as New South Wales Opposition Leader from 1977 until he lost his seat in the 1978 state election; and John Hewson, who served as Opposition Leader from 1990 to 1994, and who like Turnbull after him served as the federal Liberal leader whilst in his second term as the MP for Wentworth.

In August 2018, a challenge by Peter Dutton led to two Liberal leadership spills. Following the second spill on 24 August 2018, Treasurer Scott Morrison defeated Dutton in a leadership ballot. Turnbull did not nominate as a candidate, and immediately resigned as Prime Minister. On 31 August 2018 Turnbull resigned from Parliament, triggering the 2018 Wentworth by-election on 20 October 2018, which was won by independent candidate Kerryn Phelps. Phelps lost her seat to Dave Sharma in the 2019 Australian federal election.

Sharma lost the seat in the May 2022 Australian federal election to "teal independent" Allegra Spender.

Boundaries
Since 1984, federal electoral division boundaries in Australia have been determined at redistributions by a redistribution committee appointed by the Australian Electoral Commission. Redistributions occur for the boundaries of divisions in a particular state, and they occur every seven years, or sooner if a state's representation entitlement changes or when divisions of a state are malapportioned.

Wentworth is the second-smallest geographical electoral division in the Parliament with an area of just , covering Woolloomooloo along the southern shore of Sydney Harbour to Watsons Bay and down the coast to Clovelly—an area largely coextensive with Sydney's Eastern Suburbs. The western boundary runs along Oxford Street, Flinders Street and South Dowling Street, then eastward along Alison Road to Randwick Racecourse and Clovelly Beach. It includes the suburbs of Bellevue Hill, Ben Buckler, Bondi, Bondi Beach, Bondi Junction, Bronte, Centennial Park, Darling Point, Double Bay, Dover Heights, Edgecliff, Moore Park, North Bondi, Paddington, Point Piper, Queens Park, Rose Bay, Rushcutters Bay, Tamarama, Vaucluse, Watsons Bay, Waverley and Woollahra; as well as parts of Clovelly, Darlinghurst, East Sydney, Elizabeth Bay, Kings Cross, Potts Point and Randwick.

Members

Election results

References

External links
 Division of Wentworth – Australian Electoral Commission

Electoral divisions of Australia
Constituencies established in 1901
1901 establishments in Australia